Adhaeribacter is a genus in the phylum Bacteroidota (Bacteria).

Etymology
The name Adhaeribacter derives from:Latin v. adhaereo -ere, to adhere to, stick to; New Latin masculine gender noun, a rodbacter, nominally meaning "a rod", but in effect meaning a bacterium, rod; New Latin masculine gender noun Adhaeribacter, sticky rod.

Species
The genus contains 4 species (including basonyms and synonyms), namely
 A. aerolatus ( Weon et al. 2010, ; Greek noun aer, aeros (ἀήρ, ἀέρος) air; Latin participle masculine gender adjective latus, carried; New Latin masculine gender participle adjective aerolatus, airborne.)
 A. aerophilus ( Weon et al.. 2010, ; Greek noun aer, aeros (ἀήρ, ἀέρος)''', air; Greek masculine gender adjective φίλος, loving; New Latin masculine gender adjective aerophilus, air-loving.)
 A. aquaticus ( Rickard et al. 2005,  (Type species of the genus).; Latin masculine gender adjective aquaticus, living, growing, or found in or by water, aquatic.)
 A. terreus ( Zhang et al. 2009, ; Latin masculine gender adjective terreus'', of earth.)

See also
 Bacterial taxonomy
 Microbiology

References 

Bacteria genera
Cytophagia